{{Drugbox
| Verifiedfields = changed
| verifiedrevid = 413092968
| image = Oxaliplatin-2D-skeletal.png
| width = 200
| alt = 
| image2 = Oxaliplatin-from-xtal-Mercury-3D-balls.png
| width2 = 200
| alt2 = 

| pronounce = 
| tradename = Eloxatin
| Drugs.com = 
| MedlinePlus = a607035
| DailyMedID = Oxaliplatin
| pregnancy_AU      = 
| pregnancy_AU_comment = 
| pregnancy_category = 
| routes_of_administration = Intravenous
| class             = 
| ATC_prefix = L01
| ATC_suffix = XA03
| ATC_supplemental =  

| legal_AU          = 
| legal_AU_comment  = 
| legal_BR          = 
| legal_BR_comment  = 
| legal_CA          = 
| legal_CA_comment  = 
| legal_DE          = 
| legal_DE_comment  = 
| legal_NZ          = 
| legal_NZ_comment  = 
| legal_UK          = 
| legal_UK_comment  = 
| legal_US = Rx-only
| legal_US_comment  = 
| legal_EU          = 
| legal_EU_comment  = 
| legal_UN          = 
| legal_UN_comment  = 
| legal_status      = 

| bioavailability = Complete
| protein_bound =  
| metabolism =  
| elimination_half-life = ~10 – 25 minutes
| excretion = Kidney

| CAS_number_Ref = 
| CAS_number = 61825-94-3
| PubChem = 77994
| DrugBank_Ref = 
| DrugBank = DB00526
| ChemSpiderID_Ref = 
| ChemSpiderID = 8062727
| UNII_Ref = 
| UNII = 04ZR38536J
| KEGG_Ref = 
| KEGG = D01790
| ChEMBL_Ref = 
| ChEMBL = 414804
| PDB_ligand = 1PT

| IUPAC_name = [(1R,2R)-cyclohexane-1,2-diamine](ethanedioato-O,O)platinum(II)
| C=8 | H=14 | N=2 | O=4 | Pt=1 
| SMILES = O1C(=O)C(=O)O[Pt-2]12[NH2+]C0CCCCC0[NH2+]2
}}Oxaliplatin, sold under the brand name Eloxatin''' among others, is a cancer medication (platinum-based antineoplastic class) used to treat colorectal cancer. It is given by injection into a vein.

Common side effects include numbness, feeling tired, nausea, diarrhea, and low blood cell counts. Other serious side effects include allergic reactions. Use in pregnancy is known to harm the baby. Oxaliplatin is in the platinum-based antineoplastic family of medications. It is believed to work by blocking the duplication of DNA.

Oxaliplatin was patented in 1976 and approved for medical use in 1996. It is on the World Health Organization's List of Essential Medicines.

 Medical uses 
Oxaliplatin is used for treatment of colorectal cancer, typically along with folinic acid (leucovorin) and fluorouracil in a combination known as FOLFOX or along with capecitabine in a combination known as CAPOX or XELOX.

 Advanced colorectal cancer 
Oxaliplatin by itself has modest activity against advanced colorectal cancer. When compared with just 5-fluorouracil and folinic acid administered according to the de Gramont regimen, a FOLFOX4 regime produced no significant increase in overall survival, but did produce an improvement in progression-free survival, the primary end-point of the phase III randomized trial.

 Adjuvant treatment of colorectal cancer 
After and/or before the curative resection of colorectal cancer, chemotherapy based on 5-fluorouracil and folinic acid reduces the risk of relapse.

 Adverse effects 
Side-effects of oxaliplatin treatment can potentially include:
 Neurotoxicity leading to chemotherapy-induced peripheral neuropathy, a progressive, enduring and often irreversible tingling numbness, intense pain and hypersensitivity to cold, beginning in the hands and feet and sometimes involving the arms and legs, often with deficits in proprioception. This chronic neuropathy may also be preceded by a transient acute neuropathy occurring at the time of infusion and associated with excitation of voltage-gated Na+ channels. 
 Fatigue
 Nausea, vomiting, or diarrhea
 Neutropenia (low number of a type of white blood cells)
 Ototoxicity (hearing loss)
 Extravasation if oxaliplatin leaks from the infusion vein it may cause severe damage to the connective tissues.
 Hypokalemia (low blood potassium), which is more common in women than men
 Persistent hiccups
 Rhabdomyolysis

In addition, some patients may experience an allergic reaction to platinum-containing drugs. This is more common in women.

Oxaliplatin has less ototoxicity and nephrotoxicity than cisplatin and carboplatin.

 Structure and mechanism 
The compound features a square planar platinum(II) center. In contrast to other drugs of the platinum-based antineoplastic class of drugs cisplatin and carboplatin, oxaliplatin features the bidentate ligand trans-1,2-diaminocyclohexane in place of the two monodentate ammine ligands. It also features a bidentate oxalate group. The three-dimensional structure of the molecule has been elucidated by X-ray crystallography, although the presence of pseudosymmetry in the crystal structure has caused confusion in its interpretation.

According to in vivo'' studies, oxaliplatin fights carcinoma of the colon through non-targeted cytotoxic effects. Like other platinum compounds, its cytotoxicity is thought to result from inhibition of DNA synthesis in cells. In particular, oxaliplatin forms both inter- and intra-strand cross links in DNA, which prevent DNA replication and transcription, causing cell death.

History
Oxaliplatin was discovered in 1976 at Nagoya City University by Professor Yoshinori Kidani, who was granted U.S. Patent 4,169,846 in 1979. Oxaliplatin was subsequently in-licensed by Debiopharm and developed as an advanced colorectal cancer treatment. Debiopharm  licensed the drug to Sanofi-Aventis in 1994. It gained European approval in 1996 (initially in France) and approval by the U.S. Food and Drug Administration in 2002. Generic oxaliplatin was first approved in the United States in August 2009. Patent disputes caused generic production to stop in 2010, but it restarted in 2012.

Patent information 
Eloxatin was covered by patent numbers 5338874 (expired Apr 07, 2013), 5420319 (expired Aug 08, 2016), 5716988 (expired Aug 07, 2015) and 5290961 (expired Jan 12, 2013) (see Electronic Orange Book patent info for Eloxatin). Exclusivity code I-441, which expired on Nov 04, 2007, is for use combination with infusional 5-FU/LV for adjuvant treatment stage III colon cancer patients who have undergone complete resection primary tumor-based on improvement in disease free survival with no demonstrated benefit overall survival after 4 years. Exclusivity code NCE, New Chemical Entity, expired on Aug 09, 2007.

References

Further reading

External links 
 
 

Coordination complexes
Platinum(II) compounds
Ammine complexes
Oxalato complexes
Platinum-based antineoplastic agents
World Health Organization essential medicines
Wikipedia medicine articles ready to translate
Sanofi